Ripon College Cuddesdon is a Church of England theological college in Cuddesdon, a village  outside Oxford, England. The College trains men and women for ministry in the Church of England: stipendiary, non-stipendiary, local ordained and lay ministry, through a wide range of flexible full-time and part-time programmes.

History
Ripon College Cuddesdon was formed from an amalgamation in 1975 of Cuddesdon College and Ripon Hall. The name of the college, which is incorporated by royal charter, deliberately contains no comma.

Cuddesdon College and links with Oxbridge
Samuel Wilberforce, Bishop of Oxford, founded Cuddesdon College in April 1853, as the Oxford Diocesan Seminary at Cuddesdon to train graduates from Oxford and Cambridge. Its original buildings, designed by the Diocesan Architect for Oxford G. E. Street, were built opposite the Cuddesdon Palace. The Neo-Gothic buildings are regarded as the first important design by Street and influenced much of his later work. The College opened in June 1854 and quickly became known as Cuddesdon College. A larger chapel, built at first-floor level and with decorations by Clayton and Bell, was added by Street in 1874–5. The northwest wing opposite the chapel, was built in 1904 by Spencer Slingsby Stallwood. The southeast wing in 1920 and the service wing in 1925. Traditionally, "Cuddesdon", as it is commonly known, was in the Anglo-Catholic tradition of the Church of England. The 1921 funeral of Gilbert Middleton at St Chad's  Church, Far Headingley was officiated by Bishop James Seaton, then principal of Cuddesdon  (1914 to 1928). Seaton had known Middleton when both were students  at   Leeds Grammar School. Seaton also officiated at the Leeds wedding of Gilbert Middleton's daughter, Margaret Joyce, in January 1925. Middleton  and his brother Noel  were also friends with Canon S. R. Driver who had known Seaton at Christ Church, Oxford in the 1880s.  The Middleton brothers  attended Driver's  funeral at Christ Church, Oxford in March 1914.

Ripon Hall
Ripon Hall was founded in Ripon, Yorkshire, in 1897 or 1898. It was originally a hostel for theological students, known as Bishop's College, founded by William Boyd Carpenter, Bishop of Ripon. In 1902, it was merged with Lightfoot Hall, Birmingham and became known as Ripon Clergy College. In 1919, the college moved from Ripon to a site in Parks Road in Oxford and was renamed Ripon Hall. There, it became known as a liberal Anglican college.

In 1933, Ripon Hall moved again, this time to a house then known as Berkeley House at Boars Hill, near Oxford, the former home of the 8th Earl of Berkeley. The college remained there until the merger with Cuddesdon in 1975, when the site, renamed Foxcombe Hall, became the regional headquarters of the Open University.

Ripon College Cuddesdon
The college incorporated the Oxford Ministry Course (OMC) in 2006 and the West of England Ministerial Training Course (WEMTC) in 2011, making it the largest provider of Anglican ordination training in the UK. The college partners the Diocese of Oxford in the delivery of Ordained Local Ministry training. In 2011 the college began a partnership with the Church Missionary Society to deliver training for Ordained Pioneer Ministers – the first partnership of this kind that pairs a theological college with a missionary society. In 2005, the Oxford Centre for Ecclesiology and Practical Theology (OxCEPT) was founded, which provides research and consultancy services to the wider church.

In 2010 the college launched a £10 million appeal to build a new education centre and chapel, as well as to raise funds for endowing bursaries, fellowships, studentships and research. The new Bishop Edward King Chapel and education centre (Harriet Monsell House) were completed and opened in 2013. The chapel – by architect Niall McLaughlin – has won many national and international awards for its design and building. Harriet Monsell House also included an enclosure for a community of five Anglican sisters who had moved from their base at Begbroke Priory. The sisters work alongside staff and students, supporting in prayer and spirituality, whilst continuing to develop their own ministries of spiritual direction.

Ripon College Cuddesdon became internationally more active during Martyn Percy's period as principal. It works closely with the Anglican Church in Hong Kong and continues to have links with Anglican colleges in the United States, Canada, South Africa, Australia and New Zealand. The college developed a programme of Christian–Muslim dialogue and related work, including a Visiting Fellowship for Islamic Scholars established at Cuddesdon in partnership with the Dubai-based Al Maktoum Institute.

Present

Men and women with a range of previous experience, not necessarily graduates, take a two or three-year course of study incorporating pastoral and academic training. There are just over fifty full-time students taking courses of study, either as matriculated students at Oxford University or on courses accredited by Durham University through the Church of England Common Awards Scheme which began in September 2014. Prior to this time, students not wishing to study at Oxford University were able to take courses of study accredited by Oxford Brookes University. With the introduction of the Common Awards Scheme, Cuddesdon streamlined its Oxford University offerings. Where previously the college had offered three courses, the Bachelor of Theology (BTh), the Certificate in Theology (CTh) and the Bachelor of Arts (BA) in Theology, the BTh and CTh are no longer offered and Cuddesdon students wishing to study at Oxford University must now take the BA or MTh. The college also has occasional PhD students.

Cuddesdon students come from across the spectrum of the Church of England but it retains a liturgical approach to worship and a broad approach to theology. It maintains a regular and disciplined approach to daily prayer and seeks to train students in a modern critical approach to the Christian tradition of the Church of England.

From 2008 the part-time Oxford Ministry Course, with about fifty ordinands, has been integrated into the college. The West of England Ministerial Training Course, which trains clergy and readers principally in the dioceses of Hereford and Gloucester was incorporated in 2011 and, in 2015, Portsmouth Pathway, which trains ordinands and readers in the Portsmouth diocese.

The college runs a fortnightly part-time programme in theology and ministry; the Cuddesdon School of Theology and Ministry. In 2011 a new programme of training for pioneer ministers was set up in partnership with the Church Mission Society. The college has also hosted a research centre for practical theology, the Oxford Centre for Ecclesiology and Practical Theology (OxCEPT). It is a sponsor of the Society for the Study of Anglicanism.

The principal, since 2015, has been Humphrey Southern, former Bishop of Repton; the vice principal is Professor Canon Mark Chapman, Dean of College and Reader in Modern Theology at the University of Oxford. Roger Latham is Director of the Gloucester & Hereford Pathway supported by Jacqui Sewell in the Ludlow teaching centre; Susie Snyder is the Academic Dean; Michael Brierley is the Director of Formation, Richard Wyld is Director of the Portsmouth Pathway; Hywel Clifford teaches Old Testament and Hebrew; Sarah Brush is Lecturer in Pastoral Theology and Director of the Context Based Pathway; Rebecca Dean is Tutor for Admissions and Lecturer in New Testament; Tobias Tanton is Lecturer in Doctrine; Michael Dormandy is Lecturer in New Testament; Jen Brown is Director of CSTM. Associate staff include Joanna Collicutt, Ray Gaston, Shemil Matthew, Elaine Flowers and Eddie Howells.

In 2012 the college became the new home of the Sisters of the Community of St John Baptist and the Community of the Companions of Jesus the Good Shepherd as part of a major building programme to provide more teaching and residential accommodation, named after Harriet Monsell, founder of CSJB, as well as a new chapel named in honour of Bishop Edward King, sometime principal of Cuddesdon.

Since 2011, the College has hosted the biennial international "Christian Congregational Music: Local and Global Perspectives" conference, a gathering of scholars and practitioners across disciplines to discuss issues in contemporary congregational music. It also collaborates with the Bible Reading Fellowship for an annual Festival of Prayer

Bishop Edward King Chapel
The College is home to the Bishop Edward King Chapel.  Generously funded by the Sisters of the Communities of St John The Baptist and the Good Shepherd, who moved from Begbroke Priory to live in the College community. The 120 seat Chapel is elliptical in shape and its distinctive dog-tooth stone banding both complements the existing buildings in its material but remains very distinct in its form. The Chapel has a lattice-work timber frame which comprises curved laminated columns and beams to support a 13m high roof. It also features a series of clerestory windows, to the top of the walls, and floods the interior with light.  The Chapel has won several awards, including:

 BCIA Small Building Project of the Year award in the British Construction Industry Awards.
 The structural award and the Gold Medal at the Wood Awards.
 Oxford Preservation Trust Award  
 RIBA Award for South East

On 1 February 2013, the Bishop Edward King Chapel was dedicated by John Pritchard, Bishop of Oxford, at a celebration of the Eucharist for the Feast of the Presentation of Christ in the Temple. Michael Perham, Bishop of Gloucester, preached the sermon and Colin Fletcher, Bishop of Dorchester, assisted in the solemnities.

List of principals
Ripon Hall

 John Battersby Harford (1902 to 1919)
 Henry Dewsbury Alves Major (1919 to 1947)
 Robert Douglas Richardson (1947 to 1952)
 Geoffrey Allen (1952 to 1959)
 Gordon Fallows (1959 to 1968)
 Anthony Dyson (1969 to 1975)

Cuddesdon Theological College

 A. A. Pott (1854 to 1859)
 H. H. Swinny, vicar of Wargrave (1859 to 1862)
 Edward King (1863 to 1873)
 Charles Wellington Furse (1873 to 1883)
 William Ducat (1883 to 1894)
 John Johnston (1895 to 1913)
 James Seaton (1914 to 1928)
 Eric Graham (1928 to 1944)
 Kenneth Riches (1945 to 1952)
 Edward Knapp-Fisher (1952 to 1960)
 Robert Runcie (1960 to 1970)
 Leslie Houlden (1970 to 1975)

Ripon College Cuddesdon

 Leslie Houlden (1975 to 1977)
 David Wilcox (1977 to 1986)
 John Garton (1986 to 1996)
 John Clarke (1996 to 2004)
 Martyn Percy (2004 to 2014)
 Humphrey Southern (2015 to present)

Notable former staff

Among the college's previous staff members are:
Edward King, later Bishop of Lincoln
Allan Webb (vice-principal 1864–1867), later Bishop of Bloemfontein and of Grahamstown, subsequently Dean of Salisbury.
John Johnston (principal 1895–1913)
Charles Gore, successively Bishop of Worcester, Birmingham and Oxford and Founder of the Community of the Resurrection, Mirfield.
Robert Runcie, Archbishop of Canterbury: When Runcie retired from the archbishopric, he was created a life peer as Baron Runcie, of Cuddesdon in the County of Oxfordshire.
John Clarke, Dean of Wells Cathedral.
Paula Gooder, Tutor in Biblical Studies from 1995 to 2001.
Charlotte Methuen, lecturer in church history

Notable alumni
See also :Category:Alumni of Ripon College Cuddesdon.

Simon Aiken – Dean of Kimberley
Walter Baddeley – Bishop of Melanesia, Whitby 
Roly Bain - clown-priest
Timothy Bavin OSB – Bishop of Johannesburg, Bishop of Portsmouth and, later, monk of Alton Abbey.
Chris Bryant – MP for Rhondda
Richard Chartres – formerly Bishop of London
Owen Chadwick – Vice-Chancellor of University of Cambridge, Master of Selwyn Cambridge, Regius Professor of Modern History, Dixie Professor of Ecclesiastical History, Chancellor of University of East Anglia, President of British Academy, Rugby Union International
David Chillingworth Primus of the Scottish Episcipal Church
Geoffrey Clayton – Archbishop of Cape Town
Harold de Soysa - Anglican Bishop of Colombo
John Delight - Archdeacon of Stoke (1982-1989)
Philip Egerton – founder of Bloxham School
Austin Farrer – Warden of Keble College, Oxford
Nicholas Frayling – Dean of Chichester
Cyril Garbett – Archbishop of York (1942–1955)
John Hall - formerly Dean of Westminster Abbey
David Hand – Archbishop of Papua New Guinea
Richard Harries – formerly Bishop of Oxford (1987–2005)
John Hind – Bishop of Chichester
Graham James – formerly Bishop of Norwich
Keith Jones – Dean of York
Cosmo Gordon Lang – Archbishop of York (1909–28), Archbishop of Canterbury (1928–1942)
John Langdon, Royal Marine officer at D-Day, later became an Anglican priest
Diarmaid MacCulloch – Professor of church history at the University of Oxford
Michael Mayne – formerly Dean of Westminster Abbey (1986–1996)
Merivale Molyneux – Bishop of Melanesia
John Packer – formerly Bishop of Ripon and Leeds
Michael Perham – formerly  Bishop of Gloucester
Stephen Platten – Bishop of Wakefield
Anthony Priddis – formerly Bishop of Hereford
Michael Ramsey – formerly Archbishop of Canterbury (1961–1974)
Howard E. Root – Dean of Emmanuel College, Cambridge (1956–66), Professor of Theology, University of Southampton (1966–81) and Director of the Anglican Centre in Rome (1981–91) 
John Ruston – Bishop of St Helena (1957–1961)
Michael Scott-Joynt – formerly Bishop of Winchester
David Stancliffe – formerly Bishop of Salisbury
Thomas Stanage – Bishop of Bloemfontein
Tim Stevens – formerly Bishop of Leicester
Nigel Stock – Bishop of Stockport (2000–2007), Bishop of St Edmundsbury & Ipswich (2007–2013), Bishop at Lambeth (2013–present)
Stephen Sykes – Bishop of Ely (1990–2000)
Robert Willis – Dean of Canterbury
David Hoyle – Dean of Bristol currently Dean of Westminster
 Andrew Swift - Bishop of Brechin

References

Sources and further reading
Chapman, Mark D. (ed.), Ambassadors of Christ: Commemorating 150 Years of Theological Education in Cuddesdon 1854–2004, Burlington (Ashgate) 2004.
Chapman, Mark D., God's Holy Hill: A History of Christianity in Cuddesdon, Charlbury (The Wychwood Press) 2004.

External links
College website
Historical resources on Cuddesdon College

 
Bible colleges, seminaries and theological colleges in England
Anglo-Catholic educational establishments
Educational institutions established in 1854
Christianity in Oxford
Education in Oxfordshire
South Oxfordshire District
Anglican seminaries and theological colleges
G. E. Street buildings
Grade II* listed buildings in Oxfordshire
Anglican buildings and structures in Europe
1854 establishments in England